Vanda & Young were an Australian songwriting and producing duo composed of Harry Vanda and George Young. They performed as members of 1960s Australian rock group the Easybeats where Vanda was their lead guitarist and backing singer and Young was their rhythm guitarist and backing singer. Vanda & Young co-wrote most of the Easybeats' later hits including their international hit "Friday on My Mind" and they were the record producers for the group from 1967. Young was the older brother of Malcolm and Angus Young of the hard rock band AC/DC and also the record producer behind several of the band's biggest albums (such as 1976's Dirty Deeds Done Dirt Cheap). The "Guitar George" and "Harry" who are mentioned in the Dire Straits hit song "Sultans of Swing" are George Young and Harry Vanda.

After the Easybeats disbanded in 1969, Vanda & Young were songwriters and producers for their own projects such as the Marcus Hook Roll Band (EMI), Paintbox (Youngblood) and Haffey's Whiskey Sour (Deram), Flash and the Pan, and for other acts including producing early albums for AC/DC; they were staff producers for Albert Productions from 1973. In 1988 the Australian Recording Industry Association (ARIA) acknowledged the iconic status of Vanda & Young when they were inducted into the inaugural Hall of Fame; in 2005 the Easybeats were also inducted into the Hall of Fame. In 2001, the Australasian Performing Right Association (APRA) surveyed 100 music industry personalities for the APRA Top Ten Best Australian Songs of All Time where "Friday on My Mind" was declared No. 1. Their song for John Paul Young, "Love Is in the Air", was declared the 'Most played Australian song overseas' by APRA following its use on the 1992 film Strictly Ballroom.

1964–1969: The Easybeats

The Vandenbergs and Youngs migrated to Australia in 1963; both families were initially housed at the Villawood Migrant Hostel in Sydney. At the hostel five migrants formed the Easybeats: Stevie Wright (lead vocals), Dick Diamonde (bass), Gordon Fleet (drums), Vanda (lead guitar, backing vocals) and Young (rhythm guitar, backing vocals). Wright was their initial lyricist with Young composing the music as Vanda's grasp of English was insufficient. They were signed by EMI/Parlophone Records with Ted Albert producing their early recordings. By 1966 Vanda & Young had begun their writing partnership; together they penned the Easybeats' late 1960s recordings including "Friday on My Mind"  which reached No. 1 on the Australian singles charts in 1966 and "Good Times" (1968). The Easybeats became Australia's most popular and successful 1960s group. They travelled to the UK on 10 July 1966 where "Friday on My Mind" was produced by Shel Talmy in November. They toured Australia in May 1967 and the USA in August to promote their later singles and albums. At this time Vanda & Young were producing their recordings; by late 1969 the group returned to Australia and disbanded.

1970–1973: Based in UK
Vanda & Young returned to the UK and continued their writing and performing partnership. They recorded tracks under various names: Paintbox "Get Ready For Love" (1970), Tramp "Vietnam Rose" (1970) and Eddie Avana "Children" (1970) all on Youngblood Records; Moondance "Lazy River" (1970, A&M Records - which peaked at number 42 in Australia, their only charting single), Grapefruit "Sha-Sha" (1971, Deram Records), Haffy's Whiskey Sour "Shot in the Head" (1971, Deram) and Band of Hope "Working Class People" (1972, unreleased). Grapefruit had included Young's elder brother Alex Young (aka George Alexander). In 1972 Vanda & Young formed Marcus Hook Roll Band and recorded the singles "Natural Man", "Louisiana Lady" and "Can't Stand the Heat" in London's Abbey Road Studio during 1973 using Ian Campbell on bass, Freddie Smith on drums and Alex Young on saxophone. These tracks would later appear on the album Tales of Old Grand-Daddy released in 1974 on EMI.

1973–1978: Return to Australia and AC/DC

Vanda & Young returned to Australia in 1973 and were reunited with Ted Albert, who had established Albert Productions under EMI Records. Recently formed AC/DC's band members, and George Young's brothers, Malcolm and Angus Young joined the Marcus Hook Roll Band project on guitars to complete Tales of Old Grand-Daddy with John Proud on drums. In late 1974 Vanda & Young produced AC/DC's single "Can I Sit Next to You Girl". They also produced early albums for AC/DC including High Voltage and TNT (both 1975), Dirty Deeds Done Dirt Cheap (1976), Let There Be Rock (1977), Powerage and If You Want Blood You've Got It (both 1978). As house producers for Albert Productions record label, they also wrote for and/or produced many Australian chart-topping acts including Stevie Wright (ex-the Easybeats) with the no. 1 single "Evie", Ted Mulry, Rose Tattoo, Cheetah, William Shakespeare, Mark Williams, and the Angels. Vanda & Young also wrote and produced several hits for John Paul Young including "Standing in the Rain", "I Hate the Music", "Love Is in the Air" and "Yesterday's Hero", which was also a cover version hit when recorded by Bay City Rollers.

1977–1992: Flash and the Pan

Vanda & Young recorded several Australian hit singles under the studio-only pseudonym of Flash and the Pan, including "Hey St. Peter" (1977) and "Down Among the Dead Men" (1978). They had more success in Europe with hits "Waiting for a Train" (1983), "Midnight Man" (1984), "Early Morning Wake Up Call" (1985), and "Ayla" (1987), from the number 1 albums Headlines (1982), Early Morning Wake Up Call (1985) and Nights in France (1987). Singer-model-actress Grace Jones, in 1981, recorded a cover version of their song "Walking in the Rain".

1992–2005: "Runnin' for the Red Light (I Gotta Life)" and Stiff Upper Lip
Vanda & Young helped compose rock artist Meat Loaf's "Runnin' for the Red Light (I Gotta Life)", which was released in 1995 as the third single from the album Welcome to the Neighborhood. While the single failed to meet expectations, the parent album itself did well, peaking at number 17 on the Billboard 200.

Young produced AC/DC's 2000 album Stiff Upper Lip. Released by East West Records, it proved an international success, being RIAA certified as platinum in the United States.

Vanda left his longtime partnership with Albert Productions in 2005 and started Flashpoint Music as a private recording studio. Young died of unknown causes on 22 October 2017.

Legacy

Vanda & Young Global Songwriting Competition (2009–present)

In 2009, Australian music publishing company Alberts united with APRA AMCOS to create an international songwriters competition, seeking to acknowledge "great songwriting whilst supporting and raising money for Nordoff-Robbins Music Therapy Australia (NRMTA)."

Past winners of the Vanda & Young Global Songwriting Competition have included Megan Washington (2009), Kimbra (2011), Isabella Manfredi of the Preatures (2013), Husky Gawenda (2014), Gretta Ray (2016), Amy Shark (2018), and Matt Corby (2020).

Vanda & Young songs
This is a selected list of songs co-written by Vanda & Young:
 "Friday On My Mind" – The Easybeats (1966) Aust No. 1, US No. 16, UK No. 6, also recorded by David Bowie, London, Gary Moore, Richard Thompson
 "Good Times" – The Easybeats 1968, INXS with Jimmy Barnes 1986
 "I'm on Fire" / "Watch Me Burn" – Mike Furber 1969
 "Life is Getting Better" – Flake June 1971 Aust No. 48.
"Evie, Parts 1, 2 & 3" – Stevie Wright 1974 Aust No. 1, The Wrights, Suzi Quatro
"Hard Road" – Stevie Wright 1974, Rod Stewart
"Yesterday's Hero" – John Paul Young 1975, Bay City Rollers 1976
"Black Eyed Bruiser" – Stevie Wright 1975, Rose Tattoo 2007
"Standing in the Rain" – John Paul Young 1976
"I Hate the Music" – John Paul Young 1976
"Hey St Peter" – Flash and the Pan 1977
"Love Is in the Air" – John Paul Young (1978) Aust No. 2, US No. 7, UK No. 5
"Down Among the Dead Men" – Flash and the Pan 1978
"Walking in the Rain" – Flash and the Pan 1978, Grace Jones
"Don't You Walk That Way" - Duke Jupiter 1982
"Waiting for a Train" – Flash and the Pan 1983
"Midnight Man" – Flash and the Pan 1984
"Show No Mercy" – Mark Williams 1989
"Runnin' for the Red Light (I Gotta Life)" – Meat Loaf 1995
"Far Shore" - Judith Durham & The Seekers 1997

Awards and nominations

ARIA Music Awards
The ARIA Music Awards are an annual awards ceremony that recognises excellence, innovation, and achievement across all genres of Australian music. They commenced in 1987.

Vanda & Young were inducted into the Hall of Fame in 1988.

|-
! scope="row"| 1988
| Themselves
| ARIA Hall of Fame
| 
|}

King of Pop Awards
The King of Pop Awards were voted by the readers of TV Week. The King of Pop award started in 1967 and ran through to 1978.

|-
! scope="row"| 1974
| Themselves 
| Best Australian Songwriter
| 
|-
! scope="row"| 1976
| Themselves 
| Best Australian Songwriter
| 
|-
! scope="row" rowspan="2"| 1978
| Themselves 
| Best Australian Songwriter
| 
|-
| Themselves 
| Best Australian Record Producer
| 
|}
 Note: Wins only

Countdown Music Awards
Countdown was an Australian pop music TV series on national broadcaster ABC-TV from 1974–1987, it presented music awards from 1979–1987, initially in conjunction with magazine TV Week. The TV Week / Countdown Awards were a combination of popular-voted and peer-voted awards.

|-
! scope="row"| 1982
| Themselves
| Best Australian Producer
| 
|}

References

External links
 Albert Music: Easybeats Facts

Australian songwriters
Australian record producers
ARIA Award winners
ARIA Hall of Fame inductees
Songwriting teams
Record production duos
1964 establishments in Australia
2005 disestablishments in Australia